Ridgeway of Montana is a 1924 American silent Western film directed by Clifford Smith and starring Jack Hoxie, Olive Hasbrouck, and Herbert Fortier.

Plot
As described in a film magazine review, Buck Ridgeway, wealthy ranchman, captures members of a rustler band, but Pelton, their leader, makes a getaway in great style by jumping from his mount just at a crucial moment and hurdling over a towering rock into the river below. Buck visits the city and meets Aline Hanley who flirts with him, but he does not respond. Piqued, Aline follows him and is lost in the mountains. Buck finds her and a snowstorm compels them to spend the night together in a cabin. Buck weds Aline. She is kidnapped by Pelton. Buck conceals himself in a wagon to serve as a shield from flying bullets, rolls downhill and crashes into Pelton's shack. After a scrapping fight with Pelton, her husband rescues her and Aline is convinced of the sincerity of his love.

Cast

Preservation
A print of Ridgeway of Montana is in the collection of EYE Film Institute Netherlands.

References

Bibliography
 Darby, William. Masters of Lens and Light: A Checklist of Major Cinematographers and Their Feature Films''. Scarecrow Press, 1991.

External links

 

1924 films
1924 Western (genre) films
American black-and-white films
Films directed by Clifford Smith
Universal Pictures films
Silent American Western (genre) films
1920s English-language films
1920s American films
Films with screenplays by Richard Schayer